Fidelis Christopher Irhene (born 20 January 1996) is a Nigerian professional footballer who plays as a midfielder for Portuguese club Amora.

Club career

Youth career
Born in Jos, Nigeria, Irhene began his youth career at FC Porto U-19. He was promoted to Porto B within a year, after an impressive season with the youth side.

Senior career

Portimonense
On 30 June 2017, Irhene joined Portuguese giants Portimonense on loan.

He made his professional debut in the Segunda Liga for Portimonense on 15 August 2015, in a game against Académico de Viseu.

Porto B
He returned to Porto B after a short stint.

AEL Limassol
At the middle of the 2017–18 season, Irhene joined AEL Limassol on a two-year-deal.

Doxa Katokopias
He joined Doxa Katokopias on loan in September 2019.

Irhene became a free agent in January 2020, after his loan spell at Doxa Katokopias. He immediately terminated his contract with his parent club AEL Limassol.

References

External links

1996 births
Sportspeople from Jos
Living people
Nigerian Roman Catholics
Nigerian footballers
Nigerian expatriate footballers
FC Porto B players
Portimonense S.C. players
AEL Limassol players
Doxa Katokopias FC players
C.D. Mafra players
Amora F.C. players
Liga Portugal 2 players
Cypriot First Division players
Association football midfielders
Nigerian expatriate sportspeople in Portugal
Nigerian expatriate sportspeople in Cyprus
Expatriate footballers in Portugal
Expatriate footballers in Cyprus